The Caproni Ca.10 was a single-engine monoplane designed and built by Caproni in the early 1910s.

Design
The Caproni Ca.10 was a single-engine monoplane of conventional configuration with tailskid undercarriage and cruciform tail unit, similar to the Caproni Ca.9 from which it was derived, differentiated by having a two-seats instead of one. The second seat for the passenger was placed below the cabane pyramid, forward of the pilot's seat.

Specifications

See also 
 Giovanni Battista Caproni
 Museo dell'Aeronautica Gianni Caproni

References

Ca.010
Aircraft first flown in 1911
Experimental aircraft